The North River is a tributary of the South River in Maryland.

References

Rivers of Anne Arundel County, Maryland
Tributaries of the Chesapeake Bay
Rivers of Maryland